X-1 (or SS X-1) was one of the United States Navy's only Midget Submarines (but see the NR-1 Deep Submergence Craft). She was designed under project SCB 65; laid down on 8 June 1954, at Deer Park, Long Island, New York, by the Engine Division of Fairchild Engine and Airplane Corporation; launched on 7 September 1955, at Oyster Bay, Long Island, by Jakobson Shipyard; delivered to the Navy on 6 October at New London, Connecticut, and placed in service on 7 October 1955, with Lieutenant Kevin Hanlon in command.

Service history
X-1 served in a research capacity in rigorous and extensive tests to assist the Navy to evaluate its ability to defend harbors against very small submarines. Further tests conducted with the X-1 helped to determine the offensive capabilities and limitations of this type of submersible.

X-1 was originally powered by a hydrogen peroxide/diesel engine and battery system, but an explosion of her hydrogen peroxide supply on 20 May 1957 resulted in the craft's modification to accept a diesel-electric drive. On 2 December 1957, X-1 was taken out of service and deactivated at Philadelphia.

Towed to Annapolis, Maryland, in December 1960, X-1 was reactivated and attached to Submarine Squadron 6 and based at the Small Craft Facility of the Severn River Command for experimental duties in Chesapeake Bay. In tests conducted under the auspices of the Naval Research Laboratory, X-1 performed for scientists who observed her operations from a platform suspended beneath the Bay Bridge, to learn more about the properties and actions of sea water.

Having been in active service through January 1973, X-1 was again taken out of service on 16 February 1973. On 26 April 1973, she was transferred to the Naval Ship Research and Development Center, Annapolis. On 9 July 1974, she was slated for use as a historical exhibit; and she was later displayed on the grounds of the Naval Station complex, North Severn, near Annapolis. In 2001, X-1 was transferred to the Submarine Force Museum, in Groton, Connecticut, where she is on display in front of the main exhibit building.

Toy Version
The Lionel 3330 "Commando" submarine is based on the X-1's design.  LIONEL TRAINS 3330

References

External links

 Submarine Force Museum
 

Submarines of the United States Navy
Midget submarines
1955 ships
Museum ships in Connecticut